The Crescent Nebula (also known as NGC 6888, Caldwell 27, Sharpless 105) is an emission nebula in the constellation Cygnus, about 5000 light-years away from Earth. It was discovered by William Herschel in 1792. It is formed by the fast stellar wind from the Wolf-Rayet star WR 136 (HD 192163) colliding with and energizing the slower moving wind ejected by the star when it became a red giant around 250,000 to 400,000 years ago. The result of the collision is a shell and two shock waves, one moving outward and one moving inward. The inward moving shock wave heats the stellar wind to X-ray-emitting temperatures.

It is a rather faint object located about 2 degrees SW of Sadr. For most telescopes it requires a UHC or OIII filter to see. Under favorable circumstances a telescope as small as 8 cm (with filter) can see its nebulosity. Larger telescopes (20 cm or more) reveal the crescent or a Euro sign shape which makes some to call it the "Euro sign nebula".

See also
Cygnus Bubble

References

External links

NGC objects
Wolf–Rayet nebulae
Cygnus (constellation)
Sharpless objects
027b
?